Thanda Royal Zulu was a South African football club based in Richards Bay, KwaZulu-Natal.

History
The club started after a Swedish consortium that included Sven-Goran Eriksson bought the franchise from Benoni Premier United at the end of the 2006–07 season. The new owners moved the franchise from Benoni to KwaZulu-Natal.

They played their home games at Richards Bay Stadium in Richards Bay having previously played their home games at the Hammarsdale Stadium in Hammarsdale.

In 2010 the club moved its headquarters from Durban to Richards Bay.

The club's nickname Amabhubesi was Zulu for Lions while Thanda means love.

The club won the 2016–17 National First Division. However, their franchise, and promotion to the 2017–18 Premier Soccer League was sold to fifth-placed Amazulu.

Club records

Premier Soccer League record
 2008–09 – 15th (relegated)
 2007–08 – 14th

Shirt sponsor & kit manufacturer
Shirt sponsor: Bell Equipment
Kit manufacturer: Joma

Franchise History

External links
Premier Soccer League
NFD Club Info

 
Premier Soccer League clubs
National First Division clubs
Defunct soccer clubs in South Africa
Association football clubs established in 2007
Association football clubs disestablished in 2017
2007 establishments in South Africa
2017 disestablishments in South Africa